Leptuca saltitanta, commonly known as the energetic fiddler crab, is a species of fiddler crab native to the eastern Pacific coasts, from El Salvador in Central America to Colombia in South America.

Taxonomy

Previously a member of the genus Uca, the species was transferred in 2016 to the genus Leptuca when Leptuca was promoted from subgenus to genus level.

Description
This is a small crab with an adult carapace width of approximately 6-9mm. Females are dark, whereas non-displaying males can be gray, yellow, or brown. Displaying males are usually entirely white, but some coloring may be present.

Habitat
The species prefers to live in unshaded, open mudflats near river mouths. Mangrove stands are usually nearby.

References

Ocypodoidea
Taxa named by Jocelyn Crane
Crustaceans described in 1941